The 1958 County Championship was the 59th officially organised running of the County Championship. Surrey won the Championship title for the seventh successive year.

Table
12 points for a win
6 points to side still batting in the fourth innings of a match in which scores finish level
2 points for first innings lead
2 bonus points for side leading on first innings if they also score faster on runs per over in first innings
If no play possible on the first two days, and the match does not go into the second innings, the side leading on first innings scores 8 points.

References

External links 
 County Championship, 1958 at Cricinfo
 Surrey First-Class Matches in 1958 at CricketArchive

1958 in English cricket
County Championship seasons